Marcos Villasana is a Mexican former professional boxer and former WBC featherweight champion.

Villasana first challenged Azumah Nelson for the WBC featherweight title, losing a narrow split decision on February 25, 1986. A rematch 18 months later was also unsuccessful, as Nelson won a unanimous decision.

Villasana fought to a draw for the WBA featherweight title against Antonio Esparragoza on June 23, 1988, with Villasana getting a point deducted for a low blow in the 5th round.

Villasana's very next bout was a third shot at the WBC featherweight title against champion Jeff Fenech, which resulted in a unanimous decision defeat. Shortly thereafter, Fenech relinquished the title and moved to the super featherweight division.

Villasana won the vacant WBC featherweight title June 2, 1990, defeating Paul Hodkinson. He successfully defended the title three times before losing a unanimous decision rematch to Hodkinson on November 13, 1991.

See also
List of WBC world champions
List of Mexican boxing world champions

External links
 http://www.boxrec.com/list_bouts.php?human_id=958&cat=boxer
 http://www.boxrec.com/media/index.php?title=Human:958

1960 births
Living people
Featherweight boxers
Boxers from Guerrero
World boxing champions
Mexican male boxers